Tavan Tolgoi Airport (Tavan tolgoi nisekh buudal) is an airport serving the Tavan Tolgoi mine in Tsogttsetsii, Ömnögovi, Mongolia. It was built in 2009 by Energy Resources LLC.

Airlines and destinations

Information 
Tavan Tolgoi Airport is located 100 kilometers northeast of the regional capital of the Dalanzadgad, and 462 kilometers south of the national capital of Ulan Bator.

See also 

 List of airports in Mongolia
 List of airlines of Mongolia

References

External links 
Civil Aviation Authority of Mongolia

Airports in Mongolia
Airports established in 2009